In mathematics, the nonmetricity tensor in differential geometry is the covariant derivative of the metric tensor. It is therefore a tensor field of order three. It vanishes for the case of Riemannian geometry and can be
used to study non-Riemannian spacetimes.

Definition 
By components, it is defined as follows.

It measures the rate of change of the components of the metric tensor along the flow of a given vector field, since

where  is the coordinate basis of vector fields of the tangent bundle, in the case of having a 4-dimensional manifold.

Relation to connection
We say that a connection  is compatible with the metric when its associated covariant derivative of the metric tensor (call it , for example) is zero, i.e.

If the connection is also torsion-free (i.e. totally symmetric) then it is known as the Levi-Civita connection, which is the only one without torsion and compatible with the metric tensor. If we see it from a geometrical point of view, a non-vanishing nonmetricity tensor for a metric tensor  implies that the modulus of a vector defined on the tangent bundle to a certain point  of the manifold, changes when it is evaluated along the direction (flow) of another arbitrary vector.

References

External links

Differential geometry